Podosphaera is a genus of fungi in the family Erysiphaceae. Species in this genus are plant pathogens, causing powdery mildew.

Species

Podosphaera aphanis
Podosphaera balsaminae
Podosphaera clandestina var. aucupariae
Podosphaera clandestina var. clandestina
Podosphaera dipsacacearum
Podosphaera euphorbiae
Podosphaera euphorbiae-hirtae
Podosphaera ferruginea
Podosphaera filipendulae
Podosphaera fugax
Podosphaera fuliginea
Podosphaera fusca
Podosphaera helianthemi
Podosphaera leucotricha
Podosphaera macularis
Podosphaera mors-uvae
Podosphaera myrtillina
Podosphaera pannosa
Podosphaera parietariae
Podosphaera plantaginis
Podosphaera polemonii
Podosphaera spiraeae
Podosphaera thalictri
Podosphaera tridactyla
Podosphaera volkartii
Podosphaera xanthii

References

External links 
 Index Fungorum

 
Leotiomycetes genera
Fungal plant pathogens and diseases